Roy William Wilt (born July 4, 1935) is a former Republican member of the Pennsylvania State Senate and the Pennsylvania House of Representatives.

He earned a degree from Thiel College in 1959.

He was first elected to represent the 8th legislative district in the Pennsylvania House of Representatives in 1969. He was elected to represent the 50th senatorial district in the Pennsylvania State Senate in a special election on March 31, 1981. He held that position until 1990.

References

Thiel College alumni
People from Greenville, Pennsylvania
Republican Party Pennsylvania state senators
Republican Party members of the Pennsylvania House of Representatives
Living people
1935 births